The European Native Seeds Conservation Network (ENSCONET) is a conservation group for the preservation of wild species by maintaining a germplasm bank. It is made up of 24 institutions from 17 member states of the European Union, as well as five associate members. The network is coordinated by the "Millennium Seed Bank" of the Royal Botanic Gardens, Kew, United Kingdom and is founded under the auspices of the 6th "Research Framework Program" of the EU, and covers 5 of the 6 European biogeographic regions.

History
Although the project had been in the making for several years, it was not until November 2004 that it was definitively consolidated. The first annual meeting of ENSCONET took place at the Mediterranean Agronomic Institute of Chania, in Crete in June 2005. At this time, the drafting of a protocol agreed by all the members for future collections began. The next annual meeting took place in Valencia and was organized by the Botanical Garden of Valencia.

Main activities

The work carried out by the associated institutions within the network can be summarized in four sections:

 Collecting the seeds preferably from their natural environment, identifying the place and conditions of the specimens from which the sample is taken.
 Conservation, with the latest methods that guarantee its viability for the longest period of time possible.
 Database, containing all possible information about the specimen from which the seeds are collected, its location, date of collection, state in which it was found. All these data can be recorded both in writing and in computer support
 Dissemination of all the work carried out within the community of the institutions involved, with a view to improving the collection and conservation methods with the latest techniques among the member institutions, as well as in a more general scope to other institutions outside the field of participating members.

Member institutions

Royal Botanic Gardens, Kew, United Kingdom
National and Kapodistrian University of Athens
Institute of Botany, Slovak Academy of Sciences, Bratislava
Budapest Zoo and Botanical Garden, Budapest
Mediterranean Agronomic Institute of Chania, Crete
IMGEMA- Botanical Garden of Córdoba, Córdoba
Botanical Garden, Trinity College Dublin
Botanical Garden of Gran Canaria, Canary Islands
Agricultural Research Institute Cyprus
Bank of Plant Germplasm-UPM, Polytechnic University of Madrid, Madrid
Meise Botanic Garden, Meise
Museum National d'Histoire Naturelle, Paris
University of Pavia / Centro Flora Autóctona della Lombardia, Pavia
University of Pisa, Botanical Garden, Pisa
Botanical Garden of Soller islas Baleares
Tridentine Museum of Natural Sciences Trento, Trento
Botanical Garden, University of Valencia, Valencia
University of Vienna, Vienna
Botanical Garden Polish Academy of Sciences Warsaw, Warsaw
Botanical Gardens and Botanical Museum Berlin-Dahlem, FU Berlin
Helsingin yliopisto, Helsinki
Jardim Botânico - Foundation of the University of Lisbon, Lisbon
Natural History Museum, University of Oslo, Oslo
Institute of Botany - Bulgarian Academy of Sciences, Sofia

References

Plant conservation
2004 establishments in Europe
FP6 projects
Organizations established in 2004